
Gmina Głuszyca is an urban-rural gmina (administrative district) in Wałbrzych County, Lower Silesian Voivodeship, in south-western Poland, on the Czech border.

Neighbouring gminas
Gmina Głuszyca is bordered by the town of Jedlina-Zdrój and the gminas of Mieroszów, Nowa Ruda and Walim. It also borders the Czech Republic.

Villages
Apart from the town of Głuszyca, the gmina contains the villages of Głuszyca Górna, Grzmiąca, Kolce, Łomnica and Sierpnica.

References

Gluszyca
Wałbrzych County